Vlad Marian Pop (born 31 August 2000) is a Romanian professional footballer who plays as a central midfielder for Liga I side CS Mioveni, on loan from FC U Craiova 1948.

Club career

FC U Craiova 1948
He made his league debut on 16 July 2021 in Liga I match against CFR Cluj.

Honours
FC U Craiova 1948
Liga II: 2020–21
Liga III: 2019–20

Notes

References

External links
 
 

2000 births
Living people
Romanian footballers
Romania under-21 international footballers
Association football midfielders
Liga I players
Liga II players
Liga III players
FC U Craiova 1948 players
CS Mioveni players
Sportspeople from Târgu Mureș